Slighting is the deliberate damage of high-status buildings to reduce their value as military, administrative or social structures. This destruction of property sometimes extended to the contents of buildings and the surrounding landscape. It is a phenomenon with complex motivations and was often used as a tool of control. Slighting spanned cultures and periods, with especially well-known examples from the English Civil War in the 17th century.

Meaning and use

Slighting is the act of deliberately damaging a high-status building, especially a castle or fortification, which could include its contents and the surrounding area. The first recorded use of the word 'slighting' to mean a form of destruction was in 1613. Castles are complex structures combining military, social, and administrative uses, and the decision to slight them took these various roles into account. The purpose of slighting was to reduce the value of the building, whether military, social, or administrative.  Destruction often went beyond what was needed to prevent an enemy from using the fortification, indicating the damage was important symbolically. When Eccleshall Castle in Staffordshire was slighted as a result of the English Civil War, the act was politically motivated.

In some cases it was used as a way of punishing people who had rebelled against royal authority, or was used to undermine the authority of the owner by demonstrating their inability to protect their property. As part of the peace negotiations bringing The Anarchy of 1135–1154 to an end, both sides agreed to dismantle fortifications built since the start of the conflict. Similarly, in 1317 Edward II gave orders to dismantle Harbottle Castle in Northumberland in England as part of a treaty with Robert the Bruce. It was uncommon for someone to slight their own fortifications but not unknown; during the First War of Scottish Independence, Robert the Bruce systematically slighted Scottish castles, often after capturing them from English control. More than a century earlier, John, King of England, ordered the demolition of Château de Montrésor in France, during his war with the French king over control of Normandy.

Methods of destruction

A range of methods were used to demolish castles, each affecting the buildings in different ways. Fire might be used, especially against timber structures; digging underneath stone structures (known as undermining) could cause them to collapse; dismantling a structure by hand was sometimes done, but was time- and labour-intensive, as was filling ditches and digging away earthworks; and in later periods gunpowder was sometimes used. Manually dismantling a castle ("picking") can be split into two categories: primary damage where the intention was to slight the castle; and secondary damage which was incidental through activity such as retrieving reusable materials.

Undermining involved digging underneath a wall or removing stones at its base. When successful, the tunnel or cavity would collapse, making it difficult to identify through archaeology. Archaeological investigations have identified 61 castles that were slighted in the Middle Ages, and only five were undermined. While surviving mines are rare, one was discovered in the 1930s during excavations at Bungay Castle in Suffolk. It probably dates from around 1174 when the owner rebelled against Henry II.

The effect of slighting

Dismantling a castle was a skilled process, and stone, metal, and glass were sometimes removed to be sold on or reused. The impact of slighting ranged from almost complete destruction of a site, as can be seen at Deganwy Castle, to a token gesture, for example damaging elements such as arrowslits. In 1268, the court of King Louis IX of France gave orders to slight a new fortification near Étampes, specifying that the bailiff carrying out orders should "destroy the arrow-slits and so to break them through that it may be abundantly clear that the fortification has been slighted".

Destruction was often carefully targeted rather than indiscriminate, even when carried out on a large scale. In cases of medieval slighting, domestic areas such as free-standing halls and chapels were typically excluded from the destruction. In 1648, Parliament gave orders to slight Bolsover Castle but that "so much only be done to it as to make it untenable as a garrison and that it may not be unnecessarily spoiled and defaced." When a castle had a keep, it was usually the most visible part of the castle and a focus of symbolism. This would sometimes attract the attention of people carrying out slighting. Kenilworth was one of many castles to be slighted during the English Civil War, and the side of the keep most visible to people outside the castle was demolished.

Documentary sources for the medieval period typically have little information on what slighting involved, so archaeology helps to understand which areas of buildings were targeted and how they were demolished. For the English Civil War, destruction accounts are rare but there are some instances such as Sheffield Castle where detailed records survive. At Sheffield military and social concerns combined: there may have been a desire to prevent the Royalist owner from using the fortification against Parliament, and the destruction undermined the owner's authority. Despite this, the profits from the demolition went to the owner, contrasting with Pontefract Castle, where the money went to the townspeople.

When castles were slighted in the Middle Ages this often led to their complete abandonment, but some were repaired and others reused. This was also the case with places slighted as a result of the English Civil War. In 1650, Parliament gave orders to slight Wressle Castle; the south part of the castle was left standing so that the owner could still use it as a manor house. Berkeley Castle was also slighted in the same period – meaning that a small but significant part of the curtain wall was demolished, but the remaining structure was left intact, and the castle remains inhabited to this day.

The use of destruction both to control and to subvert control spans periods and cultures. Slighting was prevalent in the Middle Ages and the 17th century; notable episodes include The Anarchy, the English Civil War, and France in the 16th and 17th centuries, as well as Japan. The ruins left by the destruction of castles in 17th-century England and Wales encouraged the later Romantic movement.

Modern slightings

Bahrain Pearl Fishers Monument

On 18 March 2011, Bahraini government forces destroyed the Pearl Roundabout Monument. This monument had become a symbol of the Arab Spring in Bahrain and had served as the centre of the February 2011 uprising. The roundabout itself has also since been replaced with a traffic light network and renamed Al-Farooq Junction. Umar Farooq is a historical figure revered by the ruling Sunni family but hated by the Shia, who constituted the majority of the protesters.

See also

Notes

Bibliography

Further reading

External links

Fortifications
Medieval studies
Demolition
Military tactics
Castles
Wars of Scottish Independence
English Civil War